The women's pole vault event at the 2020 Summer Olympics took place on 2 and 5 August 2021 at the Japan National Stadium. 31 athletes from 19 nations competed.
In her first Olympics, 30-year-old American Katie Nageotte won the gold medal with a clearance of 4.90 metres. The silver medal went to Russian world champion Anzhelika Sidorova and the bronze to Holly Bradshaw of Great Britain.

Summary
Fifteen women qualified for the final by clearing 4.55m. 13 cleared the opening height of 4.50m, but the three who struggled at that height were among the favorites; defending champion Katerina Stefanidi, American champion Katie Nageotte and former junior world record holder Angelica Bengtsson each were down to their last attempt. At the next height, 4.70m, only four were able to get over the bar; World Champion Anzhelika Sidorova on her first attempt; 7 time British Champion Holly Bradshaw and Nageotte on their second; and again on her final attempt, Stefanidi. With a perfect series going, Sidorova had the lead, Bradshaw held the edge over Nageotte with Stefanidi off the podium as they moved the bar up to 4.80m, Stefanidi missed, Sidorova cleared to maintain her perfect series, Bradshaw missed and Nageotte made it to move into second position. Bradshaw and Stefanidi cleared on their second attempt, so the bar moved up to 4.85m. Stefanidi missed her first attempt again while the other three cleared on their first attempt. With nothing to be gained by a clearance, Stefanidi passed to the next height 4.90m. Only 9 women have ever cleared 4.90, all of these were among that group. Nobody cleared on their first attempt and when Stefanidi missed on her second and because of the earlier miss, final attempt, the medalists had been decided. Sidorova and Bradshaw missed again, then Nageotte cleared it cleanly with a scream to move into gold medal position. Sidorova passed her third attempt to make a single attempt at 4.95m for gold. Bradshaw missed equalling her personal best and finished with the bronze medal. Sidorova aborted her attempt at 4.95m passing under the bar leaving Nageotte with gold. After celebrating, Nageotte took one attempt at 5.01m to try to become #3 of all time but after already securing gold, she didn't have the fire, quitting half way down the runway.

Background
This was the 6th appearance of the event, having appeared at every Summer Olympics since 2000.

Qualification

A National Olympic Committee (NOC) could enter up to 3 qualified athletes in the women's pole vault event if all athletes meet the entry standard or qualify by ranking during the qualifying period. (The limit of 3 has been in place since the 1930 Olympic Congress.) The qualifying standard is 4.70 metres. This standard was "set for the sole purpose of qualifying athletes with exceptional performances unable to qualify through the IAAF World Rankings pathway." The world rankings, based on the average of the best five results for the athlete over the qualifying period and weighted by the importance of the meet, will then be used to qualify athletes until the cap of 32 is reached.

The qualifying period was originally from 1 May 2019 to 29 June 2020. Due to the COVID-19 pandemic, the period was suspended from 6 April 2020 to 30 November 2020, with the end date extended to 29 June 2021. The world rankings period start date was also changed from 1 May 2019 to 30 June 2020; athletes who had met the qualifying standard during that time were still qualified, but those using world rankings would not be able to count performances during that time. The qualifying time standards could be obtained in various meets during the given period that have the approval of the IAAF. Both outdoor and indoor meets are eligible. The most recent Area Championships may be counted in the ranking, even if not during the qualifying period.

NOCs can also use their universality place—each NOC can enter one female athlete regardless of time if they had no female athletes meeting the entry standard for an athletics event—in the pole vault.

Competition format
The 2020 competition continued to use the two-round format introduced in 1912. There were two distinct rounds of vaulting with results cleared between rounds. Vaulters were eliminated if they had three consecutive failures, whether at a single height or between multiple heights if they attempted to advance before clearing a height.

The qualifying round had the bar set at various heights up to a qualifying standard (to be determined closer to the start of the Games; 4.60 metres in 2016). All jumpers clearing that standard advanced to the final. A minimum of 12 jumpers advanced; if fewer than 12 achieved the qualifying standard, the top 12 (including ties after use of the countback rules) advanced.

The final had jumps starting typically just below the qualifying standard and increasing gradually. The final continued until all jumpers are eliminated.

Women's pole vault

Records
Prior to this competition, the existing world, Olympic, and area records were as follows.

Schedule
All times are Japan Standard Time (UTC+9)

The women's pole vault took place over two separate days.

Result

Qualification
Qualification Rules: Qualifying performance 4.70 (Q) or at least 12 best performers (q) advance to the Final.

Final

References

Women's pole vault
2020
Women's events at the 2020 Summer Olympics
Olympics